Images is the title of Cilla Black's sixth solo studio album released in 1971 by Parlophone Records. It was notably Black's penultimate album project with George Martin and it also was a change in direction for Black with a more contemporary pop sound.

Re-Release
On 7 September 2009, EMI Records release a special edition of the album exclusively to digital download. This re-issue features all of the album's original recordings re-mastered by Abbey Road Studios from original 1/4" stereo master tapes. A digital booklet containing original album artwork, detailed track information and rare photographs will be available from iTunes with purchases of the entire album re-issue.

Track listing
Side one
 "Faded Images" (Kenny Lynch, Tony Hicks)
 "Junk" (Paul McCartney)
 "Your Song" (Elton John, Bernie Taupin)
 "Just Friends" (Rod Edwards, Roger Hand)
 "It's Different Now" (Clive Westlake)
 "First of May" (Barry Gibb, Robin Gibb, Maurice Gibb)

Side B
 "(They Long to Be) Close to You" (Burt Bacharach, Hal David)
 "Rainbow" (William Campbell, Thomas McAleese)
 "Make It with You" (David Gates)
 "Our Brand New World" (Bobby Willis, Clive Westlake)
 "Sad Sad Song" (Roger Cook, Roger Greenaway)
 "Bridge Over Troubled Water" (Paul Simon)

Credits
Personnel
 Lead Vocals by Cilla Black
 Produced by George Martin
 Album Cover Photograph by David Nutter

References

External links
CillaBlack.com Discography – Images
EMI Music Official Site

Further reading
 

1971 albums
Cilla Black albums
Parlophone albums
EMI Records albums
Albums produced by George Martin